Brad Halbrook is a Republican member of the Illinois General Assembly. He was a small business owner who ran a company making fences before joining the general assembly.  In April 2012, Halbrook was appointed to the state legislature to fill out the term of retiring state legislator Roger L. Eddy. He did not run for re-election in 2014 and was succeeded by Reggie Phillips, and he returned to the Illinois House after the 2016 elections.

Issues
Halbrook is both socially and fiscally conservative. He supports lowering taxes and increasing the number of Illinois jobs. According to his campaign website, “In 2012, he became just the 9th State Legislator to turn down the underfunded and overly generous General Assembly Retirement System pension.” He was among a group of legislators that started a trend; as of October 2016, 33 legislators turn down the pension.

During his campaign, Halbrook advocated for lower taxes. In the past, he has spoken out against local and state tax increases. He supports property tax caps and opposes income tax increases.

Because of the number of people and jobs that have left Illinois, Halbrook says that he is committed to reforming worker's compensation laws by eliminating unnecessary regulations.

Halbrook opposes abortion, same-sex marriage, and gun control.

Halbrook was one of five Illinois representatives to vote against the Illinois Right to Vote Amendment on its passage in the Illinois House of Representatives. The bill subsequently was passed unanimously in the Illinois Senate, and was approved as a constitutional amendment by the voters of Illinois.

During his time as a state legislator, he voted in favor of bills to provide transparency for local governments. He supports redistricting reform and imposing term limits on state legislators.

Halbrook was the fifth legislator to not accept the General Assembly pension benefit for himself. He has said that he work to reform the state pension system.

In February 2021, Halbrook introduced a measure calling for Chicago to become its own state. The measure received no co-sponsors in the state House.

As of July 3, 2022, Representative Halbrook is a member of the following Illinois House committees:

 Appropriations - General Service Committee (HAPG)
 Cities & Villages Committee (HCIV)
 Counties & Townships Committee (HCOT)
 Housing Committee (SHOU)

2016 election 
In the primary election held on March 15, 2016, Halbrook defeated James Acklin and Randy Peterson. Republican incumbent Adam Brown did not seek re-election. Halbrook ran unopposed in the general election on November 8, 2016.

Republican Governor Bruce Rauner endorsed Halbrook and, in addition to several independent groups, spent money in support of his campaign. Halbrook was also endorsed by the Illinois Chamber of Commerce PAC.

Personal 
Brad Halbrook owns and operates a small farm with his wife Linda in Shelbyville. They have two children.

References

External links
Representative Brad E. Halbrook (R) 109th District at the Illinois General Assembly
By session: 101st, 100th, 98th, 97th
State Representative Brad Halbrook constituency site
Representative Halbrook's policy positions.
 

Living people
Republican Party members of the Illinois House of Representatives
21st-century American politicians
People from Pana, Illinois
People from Shelbyville, Illinois
1961 births